Turnverein Nellingen 1893 e.V. i is a German women's handball team from Ostfildern. They compete in the Handball-Bundesliga Frauen, the top division in Germany.

References

External links
 Official site

 

German handball clubs
Handball clubs established in 1893
Women's handball clubs
Women's handball in Germany
1983 establishments in Germany
Sport in Baden-Württemberg